Horace Swaby (21 June 1953 – 18 May 1999), known as Augustus Pablo, was a Jamaican roots reggae and dub record producer and a multi-instrumentalist, active from the 1970s until his death.

He popularised the use of the melodica (an instrument at that time primarily used in Jamaica to teach music to schoolchildren) in reggae music. His album King Tubbys Meets Rockers Uptown (1976) is often regarded as one of the most important examples of dub.

Biography 
He was born in St. Andrew, Jamaica, and learned to play the organ at the Kingston College School, where a girl lent him a melodica, an instrument that fascinated him. He also met Herman Chin Loy, who after working at his cousin Leslie Kong's Beverley's record shop, had set up his own Aquarius store in Half Way Tree. Swaby recorded early tracks including "Higgi Higgi", "East of the River Nile", "Song of the East" and "The Red Sea" between 1971 and 1973 for Chin-Loy's Aquarius Records. Chin Loy had previously used the name Augustus Pablo generically for keyboard instrumentals recorded by Lloyd Charmers and Glen Adams, and Swaby took the name for this recording.

"East of the River Nile", a unique blend of East Asian and Jamaican sounds, became a moderate hit. He soon joined Now Generation (Mikey Chung's band) and played keyboard with them while his friend Clive Chin began his own career as a record producer. Pablo and Chin recorded "Java" (1972) together, as soon as Pablo quit Now Generation and Clive was able to obtain studio time. This instrumental was a massive hit and launched Pablo's solo career. He recorded with Chin and others including Lee Perry and Chin's uncle, Leonard Chin. Pablo scored another smash hit with "My Desire" (John Holt).

Pablo formed the labels Hot Stuff, Message and Rockers (named after his brother's soundsystem, Rockers), and released a steady stream of well-received instrumentals, mostly versions of older hits from Studio One. In spite of his success with Rockers, Pablo's 1974 album, This Is Augustus Pablo, was recorded with Clive and Pat Chin. This was followed by a collaboration with the legendary reggae engineer King Tubby, 1975's Ital Dub.

Pablo produced a steady stream of hits in the late 1970s, including the hit "Black Star Liner" (Fred Locks). He also worked with Dillinger, Norris Reid, I-Roy, Jacob Miller, The Immortals, Paul Blackman, Earl Sixteen, Roman Stewart, Lacksley Castell, The Heptones, Bob Marley, Ricky Grant, Delroy Wilson, Junior Delgado, Horace Andy and Freddy McKay. This period was eventually commemorated with a series of critically acclaimed LPs including King Tubbys Meets Rockers Uptown (1976) and Hugh Mundell's classic Africa Must Be Free by 1983. This was followed by East of the River Nile (1978), Original Rockers (1979) and another acclaimed hit album, Rockers Meets King Tubbys in a Firehouse.

In the 1980s, Pablo's career slowed significantly. In 1980, he appeared on the soundtrack of the documentary DOA. He had begun to establish an American audience and released Rising Sun in 1986 to good reviews and sales. Pablo also produced memorable hits, including "Ragamuffin Year" (Junior Delgado), "Humble Yourself" (Asher & Tremble) and "Far Far Away" (Ricky Grant). In addition, he toured extensively throughout the world, recording a memorable live album in Tokyo in 1987. That same year, Rockers Come East re-established his career and he began to release a series of favourably reviewed though somewhat inaccessible albums in the 1990s (including Blowing With the Wind), while producing such records as Dawn Penn's "Night & Day" and Yami Bolo's "Jah Made Them All".

In 1997, he played melodica on Primal Scream's single "Star".

Augustus Pablo died as a result of a collapsed lung on 18 May 1999. He had been suffering for some time from the nerve disorder myasthenia gravis.

Personal life
Pablo was a committed Rasta. His son, Addis Pablo, followed him into a career in music, as did his daughter, Isis Swaby.

Selected discography 
Albums
 This Is...Augustus Pablo (1974)
 Ital Dub (1974)
 Thriller (1975)
 King Tubbys Meets Rockers Uptown (1976)
 East of the River Nile (1977)
 Original Rockers (1979)
 Africa Must Be Free by... 1983 Dub (1979)
 Rockers Meets King Tubbys in a Firehouse (1980)
 Authentic Golden Melodies (1980)
 Earth's Rightful Ruler (1982)
 King David's Melody (1983)
 Rising Sun (1986)
 Rebel Rock Reggae (1986)
 Rockers Come East (1987)
 Eastman Dub (1988)
 Presents Rockers Story (1989)
 Blowing with the Wind (1990)
 Presents Rockers International Showcase (1991)
 Heartical Chart (1993)* Meets King Tubby at the Control in Roots Vibes (1996)
 Red Sea (1998)
 Let's Get Started / Eastman Dub (1998)
 Valley of Jehosaphat (1999)
 El Rocker's (2000)
 The Great Pablo (2000)
 Dubbing with the Don (2001)
 Jah Inspiration (2001)
 Skanking with Pablo: Melodica for Hire 1971–77 (2002)
 In Fine Style: 7" & 12" Selection 1973–79 (2003)
 The Essential Augustus Pablo (2005)
 Augustus Pablo Meets Lee Perry & the Wailers Band (Rare Dubs 1970–1971) (2006)
 The Mystic World of Augustus Pablo: The Rockers Story (2008)
 Born to Dub You (2014)
 Augustus Pablo Presents Rockers International (2015)
 Augustus Pablo Presents Rockers International 2 (2015)
 Augustus Pablo Original Rockers (2016)
 One Step Dub (2020)
 Ancient Harmonies (2020)

Contributing artist
 The Rough Guide to Reggae (1997, World Music Network)

References

External links 

 elrockers.org Fan site
 Discography at Discogs

1953 births
1999 deaths
Dub musicians
Jamaican keyboardists
Melodica players
People from Saint Andrew Parish, Jamaica
Jamaican reggae musicians
Jamaican record producers
Island Records artists
Jamaican Rastafarians
Deaths from respiratory failure
Heartbeat Records artists
Greensleeves Records artists